Gordon Stephen "Gus" Giovanelli (born April 11, 1925) is an American former rower who competed in the 1948 Summer Olympics. He was born in Everett, Washington.

Giovanelli is the oldest surviving United States Olympic gold medalist.

References

1925 births
Living people
Rowers at the 1948 Summer Olympics
Olympic gold medalists for the United States in rowing
American male rowers
Medalists at the 1948 Summer Olympics